Poa compressa, the  Canada bluegrass or flattened meadow-grass, is a perennial flattened meadow grass, similar to common meadow-grass, Poa pratensis.  It is native to Europe but it can be found nearly worldwide as an introduced species. It grows in old wall tops, pavement cracks, dry stony grassland, and many types of wild habitat.  It has a flattened stem, 23–30 cm tall, a close one sided panicle of grey green, with purple florets.

The ligule is rounded.

References

External links
Jepson Manual Treatment
US Forest Service Fire Ecology
Illinois Wildflowers
Photo gallery

compressa
Grasses of Europe
Plants described in 1753
Taxa named by Carl Linnaeus